The 28th government of Turkey (25 December 1963 – 20 February 1965) is the third coalition government of Turkey. The prime minister, İsmet İnönü, was the leader of Republican People's Party (CHP) and a former president.

Background
After the two coalitions, two coup attempts following the 1960 Turkish coup d'état, and a defeat in by elections, İsmet İnönü formed his third coalition with independents in the parliament. His support was fragile, but New Turkey Party, which was not a part of the government, promised to support the government.

The government
Some of the cabinet members were changed during the lifespan of the cabinet. In the list below, the serving period of cabinet members who served only a part of the cabinet's lifespan are shown in the column "Notes".

Aftermath
On 13 February 1965, the four opposition parties (including YTP) overthrew the government by rejecting the annual budget of the government. On 20 February, they formed a caretaker government.

References

İsmet İnönü
Republican People's Party (Turkey) politicians
Cabinets of Turkey
1963 establishments in Turkey
1965 disestablishments in Turkey
Cabinets established in 1963
Cabinets disestablished in 1965
Coalition governments of Turkey
Members of the 28th government of Turkey
12th parliament of Turkey
Republican People's Party (Turkey)